Salivary duct carcinoma (SDC) is a rare type of aggressive cancer that arises from the salivary glands. It is predominantly seen in men and, generally, has a poor prognosis. Other high grade carcinomas can mimic SDC. About 40-60% of SDC arise in pleomorphic adenomas. Most, if not all, SDCs express androgen receptor by immunohistochemistry. Therapeutically relevant genetic alterations include ERBB2/Her2 amplification, PIK3CA and/or HRAS mutations.

Signs and symptoms
The typical presentation is a rapidly growing mass with associated pain.  This may be seen in association with neck lymph node swelling (cervical lymphadenopathy), due to metastases, and facial nerve paralysis.

Diagnosis
SDC are diagnosed by examination of tissue, e.g. a biopsy.

Their histologic appearance is similar to ductal breast carcinoma.

See also 
Salivary gland

References

External links 

Salivary gland neoplasia